Øyvind Svenning (born 29 January 1980) is a Norwegian former footballer who played as a defender. He has played for Rosenborg, Moss and Viking in Eliteserien and GIF Sundsvall in Allsvenskan.

Career
Svenning made his Eliteserien debut for Rosenborg in the 2000 season. In 2001, he played for Moss, before joining Swedish side GIF Sundsvall in 2002. On 29 June 2005, Svenning joined Viking on a three-year contract. In July 2006, he launched a music single; This Is For Real, together with four other professional Norwegian footballers — Morten Gamst Pedersen, Freddy dos Santos, Raymond Kvisvik, and Kristofer Hæstad. They called their band The Players. In July 2007, he joined Norwegian Third Division side Randaberg alongside Bjarte Lunde Aarsheim. He later played for Sandved, where he ended his career.

References

1980 births
Living people
People from Åfjord
Norwegian footballers
Rosenborg BK players
Byåsen Toppfotball players
Moss FK players
GIF Sundsvall players
Viking FK players
Randaberg IL players
Sandved IL players
Allsvenskan players
Expatriate footballers in Sweden
Norwegian expatriate footballers
Norwegian expatriate sportspeople in Sweden
Eliteserien players
Association football defenders
Sportspeople from Trøndelag